The Harrow Peaks are a group of rugged peaks in the eastern part of the Random Hills, bounded on the north by Clausnitzer Glacier and on the east by Tinker Glacier, overlooking the northwestern extremity of Wood Bay on the coast of Victoria Land, Antarctica. They were mapped by the United States Geological Survey from surveys and U.S. Navy air photos, 1955–63, and were named by the Advisory Committee on Antarctic Names for Geoffrey N. Harrow, a biologist at McMurdo Station, 1965–66 season.

References

Mountains of Victoria Land
Borchgrevink Coast